Thomas Clifford may refer to:
 Thomas Clifford, 1st Baron Clifford of Chudleigh (1630–1673), English statesman and politician
 Thomas Clifford, 6th Baron Clifford (1363–1391)
 Thomas Clifford, 8th Baron Clifford (1414–1455)
 Thomas Clifford-Constable (1807–1870), British landowner and Member of Parliament
 Thomas Clifford, 14th Baron Clifford of Chudleigh (born 1948), British baron
 Thomas Clifford (footballer) (1875–1917), Scottish footballer
 Tom Clifford (politician), municipal politician in Toronto, Ontario, Canada
 Tom Clifford (rugby union) (1923–1990), Irish rugby union player
 Tom Clifford (footballer), English footballer

See also 
 Clifford (name)